Shoulda Gone Dancin'  was the third album by High Inergy and the first after the departure of lead vocalist Vernessa Mitchell. Now reduced to a trio, this album features Barbara Mitchell (Vernessa's sister) on lead vocals. It peaked at #72 on Billboard's R&B Album charts and #147 on the Pop Album charts. The album spawned one chart single, the title track, which was a moderate dance and R&B hit.

Track listing 
The following is the track listing from the original vinyl LP.
Side One
"Shoulda Gone Dancin'" (Donnell Jones, Anthony Mason) - 9:44
"I've Got What You Need" (Marvin Augustus, Patricia Scott) - 4:36
"Come and Get It" (Mel Bolton, Gwen Gordy Fuqua) - 3:34

Side Two
"Midnight Music Man" (Terry Lupton, Chuck Creath) - 3:44
"Let Yourself Go" (Roger Dollarhide) - 4:51
"Love of My Life" (Terry Lupton, Chuck Creath) - 3:37
"Too Late (The Damage is Done)" (Dreda Augustus, Linda Joyce Evans, Marvin Augustus) - 4:20

Production  
The following information comes from the original vinyl LP.

Producers: Anthony Mason, Marvin Augustus, Mel Bolton, Chuck Creath, Roger Dollarhide, Gwen Gordy Fuqua and Kent Washburn
Arrangers: Anthony Mason, Marvin Augustus, William Bickelhaupt, Mel Bolton, Roger Dollarhide, L. A. Johnson, Donnell Jones and Gerald Lee 
Recording Engineers: Roger Dollarhide, Peter Haden, Bob Robitaille, David Coe and Steve Smith
Mixing Engineers: Russ Terrana, Jane Clark, Roger Dollarhide and Art Stewart
Mastering Engineer: Jack Andrews
Assistant Engineers: Dennis Moody, Peter Haden, Romie Lovrich, Leslie Kearney, Dan Lopman, Ernestine Madison, Gail Ritter, James Warmack, Deborah Scott, Virginia Pallante, John Howe, Brian Vessa and Ralph Lotten
Art Direction: Norm Ung
Design and Illustration: Vigon Nahas Vigon
Logo Design: Tom Nikosey
Project Manager: Brenda M. Boyce
Executive Producer: Berry Gordy

Session musicians  
The following information comes from the original vinyl LP.

 Nate Alford, Jr. - percussion
 Jack Ashford - percussion
 John Barnes - keyboards, synthesizer
 Kevin Bassinson - keyboards
 Alvino Bennett - drums
 William Bickelhaupt - acoustic piano
 Michael Boddicker - synthesizer
 Mel Bolton - guitar
 Chuck Creath - Fender Rhodes, synthesizer
 Ron Davison - congas
 Quentin Dennard - drums
 Roger Dollarhide - electric piano
 Steve Fishman - bass
 James Gadson - drums
 Greg Grahan - percussion
 Richard Graham - percussion
 John Green - guitar
 James Jamerson, Jr. - bass
 James Jamerson, Sr. - bass
 Gerald Lee - percussion
 Kenneth Lupper - acoustic piano
 Anthony Mason - bass
 Greg Middleton - bass
 David Pruitt - guitar
 Melvin "Wah Wah" Ragin - guitar
 Robert Robertie - drums
 Werner Schuchner - guitar
 Mike Thompson - electric piano
 David T. Walker - guitar
 Benny Wallace - guitar
 Kent Washburn - vibes
 Melvin Webb - percussion

References 

1979 albums
Gordy Records albums
High Inergy albums